Luke Sutherland (born 1971) is a Scottish novelist and musician.  A full-time member of two independent bands and an occasional member of Mogwai, active also as a music producer, he has also published a number of written works.

Biography
Sutherland grew up in Orkney and the town of Blairgowrie in Perthshire. While he was at the University of Glasgow, he and others formed the Scottish post-rock band Long Fin Killie, who were active from 1993 until 1998. The band recorded three albums for the independent label Too Pure: Houdini (1995), Valentino (1996) and Amelia (1998). He then formed Bows, the band releasing two albums.  Since 2000, he has been an occasional and touring member of Mogwai, playing violin and more recently guitar. He also sings on and has a writing credit for the track "Mexican Grand Prix". He also sings with a band called Music A.M. with Stefan Schneider and Volker Bertelmann, releasing three albums: A Heart & Two Stars (2004), My City Glittered Like a Breaking Wave (2005) and Unwound From The Wood (2006). Sutherland has recently formed the band Rev Magnetic.

Sutherland's debut novel, Jelly Roll, was nominated for the Whitbread Prize in the first novel category in 1998. His novella Venus As A Boy (2004) talks extensively about Sutherland's own childhood in Orkney, where he and his sister were the sole Scots-African children.

Bibliography
Jelly Roll, Anchor (1998)
Sweetmeat, Anchor (2002)
Venus as a Boy, Bloomsbury (2004)

References

External links
Biography, British Arts Council
Bows/Lukesutherland Music, MySpace Music Page

1971 births
Living people
Alumni of the University of Glasgow
Anglo-Scots
Musicians from London
People from Orkney
Gay singers
Gay songwriters
Gay novelists
Scottish LGBT novelists
Scottish LGBT singers
Scottish LGBT songwriters
Scottish adoptees
Scottish novelists
Scottish songwriters
Scottish violinists
British male violinists
Black British writers
Black British musicians
21st-century violinists
21st-century British male musicians
People from Perthshire
21st-century British male writers
British male songwriters
Scottish gay musicians